Daniel Antopolsky (born March 19, 1948) is an American singer-songwriter. He plays the guitar, harmonica, and kazoo. He began writing songs in the 1960s, but did not release any of his own work commercially until 2015, when he was 66 years old. He is associated with the Outlaw country movement, and describes his music as being influenced by country, blues, rock & roll, gospel, and synagogue harmonies.

Early life
Daniel Antopolsky was born in Augusta, Georgia to a Jewish Family. His family owned the Antopolsky hardware store in downtown Augusta which his father ran. His mother died of Parkinson’s disease when Antopolsky was 10 years old, and his father died 7 years later. He was largely raised by Francis Norman, his African-American caretaker who Antopolsky credits with introducing him to gospel and blues music. Antopolsky wrote his first song when he was 14.

Antopolsky attended the University of Georgia, where he received a degree in public relations and advertising. He avoided the Vietnam war and worked odd jobs and played music.

Career 
In 1972, Antopolsky met Townes Van Zandt in a coffee shop in Athens, Georgia and they became friends. They toured together for several months in Antopolsky’s Ford van and visited Guy Clark, going to Nashville, Colorado and Texas. At 24 years old, Antopolsky saved Van Zandt’s life by performing CPR after Van Zandt had overdosed on heroin. The two of them were alone together when Van Zandt wrote Pancho and Lefty and Antopolsky wrote Sweet Lovin’ Music.

In 2015, Antopolsky released his debut album, Sweet Lovin’ Music, which was produced by Gary Gold and John Capek. He then performed at South by Southwest in 2016. In 2018 he performed at Bush Hall, and in 2019 performed at the Black Deer Festival.

A documentary about Antopolsky’s life premiered as a rough cut at Nashville Film Festival in 2019, called “Sheriff of Mars”, directed by Jason Ressler and Matthew Woolf.

Personal life 
Antopolsky lives in Bordeaux, France.

Discography 
 Sweet Lovin’ Music (2015)
 Acoustic Outlaw, Vol. 1 (2016)
 Acoustic Outlaw, Vol. 2 (2016)
 Old Timey, Soulful, Hippy-Dippy, Flower Child Songs from the Cosmos… Wow!(Unheard Songs of the Early 1970s, Pt. 1) (2017)
 Old Timey, Soulful, Hippy-Dippy, Flower Child Songs from the Cosmos… Wow!(Unheard Songs of the Early 1970s, Pt. 2) (2022)

References 

American country singer-songwriters
American male singer-songwriters
American country guitarists
American male guitarists
1948 births
American alternative country singers
American folk singers
Musicians from Augusta, Georgia
People from Augusta, Georgia
20th-century American singers
20th-century American guitarists
American acoustic guitarists
Living people